Catherine J. Potenski is an American microbiologist and the former chief editor of Nature Genetics.

Education 
Potenski obtained a PhD in microbiology from New York University Grossman School of Medicine for her research on Q/N-rich protein aggregates and prions in the yeast model system. At the university she worked in Irina Derkatch's laboratory.

Career 
Potenski did five years of postdoctoral research on mechanisms of ribonucleotide-induced DNA damage in yeast working with Hannah Klein. 

In 2015 she joined Nature Genetics, and was chief editor from 2019 to 2022.

References 

Living people
Academic journal editors
American biologists
New York University Grossman School of Medicine alumni
American women biologists
Year of birth missing (living people)